Antaeotricha loxogrammos is a moth in the family Depressariidae. It was described by Philipp Christoph Zeller in 1854. It is found in Brazil.

References

Moths described in 1854
loxogrammos
Moths of South America